The Last Opium Den is an investigative journalism/travel book by Nick Tosches. It was originally an article in Vanity Fair, where Tosches is a contributing editor. Tosches travels the world (in particular, Southeast Asia) seeking the titular establishment. He also spends time discussing the heroin/opium trade, the history of opium dens, wine tasting, and the historical use of opium to treat symptoms of diabetes.

See also
Confessions of an English Opium-Eater

External links
Tony and Friends Podcast An Anthony Bourdain: No Reservations deleted scene. Tony and Nick discuss Southeast Asia and The Last Opium Den.

Books by Nick Tosches
American travel books
2002 non-fiction books
Works about opium